The write is one of the most basic routines provided by a Unix-like operating system kernel. It writes data from a buffer declared by the user to a given device, such as a file. This is the primary way to output data from a program by directly using a system call. The destination is identified by a numeric code. The data to be written, for instance a piece of text, is defined by a pointer and a size, given in number of bytes.

write thus takes three arguments:
 The file code (file descriptor or fd).
 The pointer to a buffer where the data is stored (buf).
 The number of bytes to write from the buffer (nbytes).

POSIX usage 

The write call interface is standardized by the POSIX specification. Data is written to a file by calling the write function. The function prototype is:

 ssize_t write(int fildes, const void *buf, size_t nbyte);

In above syntax, ssize_t is a typedef. It is a signed data type defined in stddef.h. Note that write() does not return an unsigned value; it returns -1 if an error occurs so it must return a signed value.
The write function returns the number of bytes successfully written into the file, which may at times be less than the specified nbytes. It returns -1 if an exceptional condition is encountered, see section on errors below.

Usage example 
#include <stdio.h>
#include <string.h>
#include <stdlib.h>
#include <fcntl.h>
#include <unistd.h>

int main (int argc, char *argv[])
{
    int fd1;
    char buf[128];
    fd1 = open(argv[1], O_WRONLY);
    if (fd1 == -1) {
        perror(argv[1]);
        return EXIT_FAILURE;
    }

    /* Enter the data to be written into the file */
    scanf("%127s", buf);

    write(fd1, buf, strlen(buf)); /* fd1 is the file descriptor, buf is the character array used to
 hold the data, strlen(buf) informs the function that the number of bytes equal to the length of the
 string in the buffer need to be copied */

    close(fd1);

    return 0;
}

Errors encountered during operation 
Listed below are some errors that could be encountered during writing to a file. The errors are macros listed in errno.h.

Higher level I/O functions calling write 

The write system call is not an ordinary function, in spite of the close resemblance. For example, in Linux with the x86 architecture, the system call uses the instruction INT 80H, in order to transfer control over to the kernel. The write system call, and its counterpart read, being low level functions, are only capable of understanding bytes. Write cannot be used to write records, like classes. Thus, higher level input-output functions (like printf) are required. Often, the high-level interface is preferred, as compared to the cluttered low-level interface. These functions call other functions internally, and these in turn can make calls to write, giving rise to a layered assembly of functions.

With the use of this assembly the higher level functions can collect bytes of data and then write the required data into a file.

See also 
 fwrite
 getchar
 fprintf
 read (system call)
 sync (Unix)

References

External links 
 POSIX write
 

C POSIX library
System calls